The Media Control Interface — MCI for short — is a high-level API developed by Microsoft and IBM for controlling multimedia peripherals connected to a Microsoft Windows or OS/2 computer, such as CD-ROM players and audio controllers.

MCI makes it very simple to write a program which can play a wide variety of media files and even to record sound by just passing commands as strings. It uses relations described in Windows registries or in the [MCI] section of the file . One advantage of this API is that MCI commands can be transmitted both from the programming language and from the scripting language (open script, lingo aso).

, the MCI interface has been phased out in favor of the DirectX APIs first released in 1995.

MCI Devices 

The Media Control Interface consists of 7 parts:
cdaudio
digitalvideo
overlay
sequencer
vcr
videodisc
waveaudio

Each of these so-called MCI devices (e.g. CD-ROM or VCD player) can play a certain type of files, e.g.  plays  files,  plays CD-DA tracks among others. Other MCI devices have also been made available over time.

Playing media through the MCI interface 
To play a type of media, it needs to be initialized correctly using MCI commands. These commands are subdivided into categories:
System Commands
Required Commands
Basic Commands
Extended Commands

A full list of MCI commands can be found at Microsoft's MSDN Library.

References

External links
Microsoft MCI Reference - MSDN Library

Microsoft application programming interfaces